The 1949 Alabama Crimson Tide football team (variously "Alabama", "UA" or "Bama") represented the University of Alabama in the 1949 college football season. It was the Crimson Tide's 55th overall and 16th season as a member of the Southeastern Conference (SEC). The team was led by head coach Harold Drew, in his third year, and played their home games at Denny Stadium in Tuscaloosa, Legion Field in Birmingham and Ladd Stadium in Mobile, Alabama. They finished with a record of six wins, three losses and one tie (6–3–1 overall, 4–3–1 in the SEC).

Alabama opened the season with losses against Tulane and at Vanderbilt before they notched their first win of the season against Duquesne at Denny Stadium. A week later, the Crimson Tide played Tennessee to a tie before they won five consecutive games over Mississippi State, Georgia, Georgia Tech,  and Florida. Alabama then closed their season with a 14–13 loss to Auburn in the Iron Bowl after Ed Salem missed an extra point that would have tied the game with less than two minutes left in the game.

Schedule

Game summaries

Tulane

Source:

To open the 1949 season, Alabama traveled to Mobile and were defeated 28–14 by the Tulane Green Wave to open the second consecutive season with a loss. After a scoreless first quarter, Tulane took a 7–0 halftime lead after George Kinek scored on a four-yard touchdown run. The Greenies extended their lead further in the third quarter to 14–0 when Eddie Price scored on an 11-yard run. In the fourth quarter, Bill Svoboda scored a pair of touchdowns on a one-yard run and on an 85-yard kickoff return for Tulane. Alabama scored both of their touchdowns on a pair of passes; the first on a 78-yard pass from Ed Salem to Bill Abston and the second on a 23-yard Butch Avinger pass to Tom Calvin to make the final score 28–14. The loss brought Alabama's all-time record against Tulane to 15–7–1.

Vanderbilt

Source:

The Crimson Tide lost for the second consecutive week against the Vanderbilt Commodores by a final score of 14–7 at Dudley Field. After a scoreless first quarter, both teams scored second-quarter touchdowns in a span of just one minute to make the halftime score 7–7. The Commodores scored first on a 29-yard Dean Davidson run and the Crimson Tide responded with a nine-yard Ed Salem pass to Tom Calvin. Joe Hicks then scored the game-winning touchdown in the fourth quarter on a one-yard run. Alabama then drove to the Vandy 12-yard line late in the fourth when a fourth down pass went incomplete to preserve the Commodores victory. The loss brought Alabama's all-time record against Vanderbilt to 16–12–1.

Duquesne

Sources:

In their first Tuscaloosa game of the season, Alabama defeated the Duquesne Dukes, for the third consecutive season, by a final score of 48–8 on a Friday evening. The Crimson Tide opened the scoring with three first-quarter touchdowns on a 36-yard Tom Calvin run, a 61-yard James Melton run and on a 20-yard Butch Avinger pass to Al Lary for a 20–0 lead. In the second quarter, Alabama scored first on a one-yard Ralph Cochran run, and then the Dukes responded with their only touchdown of the game on a three-yard Chuck Rapp run to make the score 27–6. The Crimson Tide then scored on the kickoff that ensued when a 101-yard Jim Burkett return made the halftime score 34–6.

Alabama then closed the scoring for the evening with a pair of third-quarter touchdowns. The first came on a 76-yard J. D. Roddam run and the second on a 22-yard Lary run to make the score 48–6. The Dukes then scored the final points of the game in the fourth quarter when Frank Yacina tackled George McCain for a safety to make the final score 48–8. The victory improved Alabama's all-time record against Duquesne to 3–0.

Tennessee

Sources:

Alabama played the rival Tennessee Volunteers to a 7–7 tie at Legion Field in a driving rainstorm. The only points of the game came on a pair of one-yard touchdown runs in the first half. Bernie Sizemore scored for the Volunteers in the first quarter and James Melton scored for the Crimson Tide in the second quarter. The tie brought Alabama's all-time record against Tennessee to 17–10–4.

Mississippi State

Source:

On homecoming in Tuscaloosa, the Crimson Tide scored touchdowns in all four quarters and defeated the Mississippi State Maroons 35–6 at Denny Stadium. Lionel W. Noonan scored the initial Alabama touchdown on a two-yard run in the first. In the second, Ed Salem scored on a three-yard run and later threw a 20-yard touchdown pass to Al Lary for a 21–0 halftime lead. The Crimson Tide further extended their lead with touchdown runs of three-yards by J. D. Roddam in the third and of two-yards by Jim Burkett in the fourth to make the score 35–0. The Maroons then ended the shutout attempt with just 0:02 remaining in the game when Max Stainbrook returned an interception 60-yards for a touchdown as time expired to make the final score 35–6. The victory improved Alabama's all-time record against Mississippi State to 25–7–2.

Georgia

Sources:

One year after Georgia gave the Crimson Tide their worst defeat since the 1910 season, Alabama upset the Bulldogs 14–7 on homecoming in Athens. In the second quarter, Alabama scored on a one-yard Butch Avinger run and Georgia on a five-yard Floyd Reid run for a halftime score of 7–7. After a scoreless third, the Crimson Tide scored the game-winning touchdown in the fourth quarter on a 25-yard Ed Salem pass to James Melton. The victory improved Alabama's all-time record against Georgia to 17–15–3.

Georgia Tech

Source:

Before 43,000 fans at Legion Field, Alabama defeated the Georgia Tech Yellow Jackets 20–7 for their third conference victory of the season. After a scoreless first quarter, the Yellow Jackets took a 7–0 halftime lead when George Humphreys threw a 32-yard touchdown pass to Charles Harvin late in the second. Alabama then took the lead with a pair of third-quarter touchdowns scored by Ed Salem on a five-yard run and on a 25-yard Butch Avinger pass to Al Lary. Salem then made the final score 20–7 late in the fourth with his three-yard touchdown run for the Crimson Tide. The victory improved Alabama's all-time record against Georgia Tech to 16–12–3.

Mississippi Southern

Source:

Although the Golden Eagles scored 26 fourth quarter points, Alabama defeated Mississippi Southern at Denny Stadium 34–26. The Crimson Tide opened the scoring with a pair of first-quarter touchdown passes from Ed Salem to Ed White for a 14–0 lead. In the second quarter, Butch Avinger scored touchdowns on a quarterback sneak and on his five-yard pass to Al Lary for a 27–0 halftime lead. Before Southern scored their 26 fourth quarter points, Bob Cochran threw a 12-yard touchdown pass to Charley Davis to give Alabama a 34–0 lead as they entered the fourth. In the fourth quarter Southern touchdowns were scored by Morris Brown on a four-yard run, a 95-yard Bobby Holmes punt return, a 43-yard Brown run and then on a second Holmes punt return for 85-yards. The victory improved Alabama's all-time record against Mississippi Southern to 3–0.

Florida

Source:

In their final road game of the season, Alabama defeated the Florida Gators 35–13 for their fifth consecutive win on the season. The victory improved Alabama's all-time record against Florida to 7–3.

Auburn

Source:

In the second meeting since the renewal of the series, Alabama was upset by Auburn 14–13 at Legion Field. After a scoreless first, Auburn took a 7–0 lead in the second quarter when Johnny Wallis intercepted an Ed Salem pass and returned it 19-yards for the touchdown. Alabama responded with just seconds remaining in the half with a 13-yard Salem touchdown run to tie the game 7–7 at halftime. The Tigers retook the lead early in the fourth on a ten-yard George Davis run. The Crimson Tide responded with a three-yard Tom Calvin touchdown run with just under two minutes left in the game. However, Salem missed the extra point to give Auburn the 14–13 victory. The loss brought Alabama's all-time record against Auburn to 5–8–1.

Personnel

Varsity letter winners

Coaching staff

References
General

 

Specific

Alabama
Alabama Crimson Tide football seasons
Alabama Crimson Tide football